Tikkanen is a Finnish surname meaning "small woodpecker". Notable people with the surname include:

 Aino-Maija Tikkanen (1927–2014), Finnish film actress
 Esa Tikkanen (born 1965), retired Finnish professional ice hockey player
 Märta Tikkanen (born 1935), Finnish writer
 Päivi Tikkanen (born 1960), former long-distance runner from Finland
 Toivo Tikkanen (1888–1947), Finnish architect
 Hans Tikkanen (born 1985), Swedish chess Grandmaster
 Harri Tikkanen (born 1981), Finnish ice hockey defenceman
 Henrik Tikkanen (1924–1984), Finnish anti-war author
 Jouki Tikkanen (born 1995), Finnish rhythmic gymnast

See also
 Tikkanen (horse)

Finnish-language surnames